Trad.Attack! is an Estonian band. The band consists of Sandra Vabarna (torupill, vocals), Jalmar Vabarna (guitar, vocals), and Tõnu Tubli (drums, vocals). They sing in Estonian or Estonian dialects.

History
Before starting the new band project in 2013, all three band members were successful as musicians on their own. The bagpipe player and vocalist Sandra Vabarna (then Sandra Sillamaa) has an academic degree in folk culture/music studies. The original idea was to form a group performing Estonian folk music inspired by old traditional folk music and contemporary music. Trad.Attack! sometimes uses samples from archive recordings as the lead vocals and backs them with their own original rock, pop, and electronic instrumentals.

At their first concert, they joked onstage about having a master plan: to be up to perform in every country in the world. Within eight years, Trad.Attack! played in 38 countries. The band played at many showcase-festivals including Tallinn Music Week (Estonia), Folk Alliance (US), V-ROX (Russia), Eurosonic (the Netherlands), Sound of the Xity and Strawberry Festival (China), Minas Musica Mundo (Brazil), WOMEX (Spain), Trans Musicales Festival (France), WOMAD (Chile), Summerfolk Music and Crafts Festival (Canada), and the Woodford Folk Festival (Queensland, Australia).

The eleven tracks of their third full-length studio album Make Your Move (2020) extend the boundaries of the folk genre with distorted guitars, floor-filling beats and effect pedal manipulated bagpipes. They want to have a stage sound as big as a trio can produce by technical means. Drummer Tõnu Tubli plays also trombone. All songs were tested to work for big festival stage audiences as well as unplugged. They released MYMIATURES - Songs That Never Grew Up in 2020. It features short tracks of songs that already made it to Make Your Move as well as tracks that for now have remained to an idea level.

In 2021 the band released We Miss Playing for You, an album of live recordings. In 2022 Trad.Attack! joined forces with 19 remixers from 8 different countries and released Remixed, an album with the greatest hits from band's discography to which all the remixers added their own touch.

On March 31, 2023 Trad.Attack! will be releasing their fourth studio album "Bring It On".

Band members
 Sandra Vabarna – torupill, vocals 
 Jalmar Vabarna – guitar, vocals 
 Tõnu Tubli – drums, vocals

Discography
Albums
 AH! (2015)
 Kullakarva (2017)
 Make Your Move (2020)
 MYMIATURES - Songs That Never Grew Up (2020)
 We Miss Playing for You (2021)
 Remixed (2022)

'Extended plays
 Trad.Attack! (2014)''

Recognition

Trad.Attack! is the winner of:

 Estonian pop music award "Golden Album 2021" - Band and Album of the Year
 Estonian Music Awards 2021 - Song & Ethno/Folk Album of The Year
 Estonian Foreign Ministry's Culture Prize 2020 for successful concert activities and promotion of Estonian culture abroad
 Estonian Ethno Music Awards 2020 - Band and Song of the Year
 Estonian pop music award "Golden Album 2018" – Most Sold Band CD of the Year & Most Sold Vinyl of the Year in Estonia
 Estonian Music Awards 2018 – Ethno/Folk Album and Band of the Year
 Estonian Ethno Music Awards 2017 – Album, Band and Song of the Year
 Estonian Ethno Music Awards 2016 – Best Band
 Estonian Music Awards 2016, – Best Band, Best Album, Best Ethno/Folk Album
 Estonian Ethno Music Awards 2015 – Best Band, Best Album and Best Song 
 Estonian Music Awards 2015 – Ethno/Folk album and Music Video of the year 
 Estonian Ethno Music Awards 2014 – Best Band, Best Album, Best Song, Best Newcomer
 Radio 2 special award

References

External links

Estonian folk music groups
Folktronica musicians